The MaK G 1201 BB is a four axle B'B' diesel-hydraulic off-centre cab locomotive built by the Maschinenbau Kiel in German. The locomotive is designed for shunting and freight work, such as found on industrial railways.

Description
Only one example of this locomotive was built, later orders for a similar purpose were fulfilled by the MaK G 1203 BB which replaced the MTU 331 engine with a MTU 396 engine of increased power.

The locomotive has worked since 1980 at Solvay's plant nr. Rheinberg, Germany.

References

MaK locomotives
Standard gauge locomotives of Germany
Railway locomotives introduced in 1978
B-B locomotives